The Wolfson Professor of Criminology is a senior professorship at the University of Cambridge.  The position was established in 1960 by a benefaction by the Wolfson Foundation and is the first of its kind in Britain.  The position's first holder was Sir Leon Radzinowicz.

Wolfson Professors of Criminology 
 Sir Leon Radzinowicz, 1959–1973
 Nigel Walker, 1973–1984
 Sir Anthony Bottoms, 1984–2006
 Lawrence W. Sherman, 2006–2017
 Manuel Eisner, 2017–present

References

Criminology, Wolfson
School of the Humanities and Social Sciences, University of Cambridge
Criminology, Wolfson
1960 establishments in England